Quercus acherdophylla is a species of oak native to Mexico.

Description
Quercus acherdophylla is typically a medium-sized evergreen tree, up to 25 meters tall. Its appearance is similar to Quercus laurina, particularly its leaf size. The acorns of Q. acherdophylla mature annually, in contrast to the biennial acorn maturation of Q. laurina.

Range and habitat

Quercus acherdophylla lives in cloud forests along the eastern slopes of the southern Sierra Madre Oriental and easternmost Trans-Mexican Volcanic Belt in the states of Hidalgo, Puebla, and Veracruz, extending into the northern Sierra Madre de Oaxaca of northernmost Oaxaca state.

It inhabits very humid ravines between 1800 and 2500 meters elevation. Its population can be sparse in portions of its range. It is a dominant species on mountain ridges in the Sierra Madre de Oaxaca of Huautla de Jiménez, Oaxaca.

The population of Q. acherdophylla has been little studied.

References

External links

acherdophylla
Flora of the Sierra Madre Oriental
Flora of the Sierra Madre de Oaxaca
Flora of the Trans-Mexican Volcanic Belt
Cloud forest flora of Mexico
Endemic oaks of Mexico
Taxa named by William Trelease